Aldford Iron Bridge is a bridge crossing the River Dee north of the village of Aldford, Cheshire, England, linking the village with Eaton Hall, forming part of the Buerton Approach to the hall. It is recorded in the National Heritage List for England as a designated Grade I listed building.

The bridge was designed by Thomas Telford and built by William Hazledine for the 1st Marquis of Westminster and was completed in 1824. It is built in cast iron and has yellow sandstone abutments forming a single arch measuring 50 metres. It has cast iron railings and double gates at the crown of the bridge.

The bridge provides a crossing over the river for the long-distance footpath of the Marches Way.

References

See also

Grade I listed buildings in Cheshire West and Chester
Listed buildings in Aldford

Grade I listed bridges
Bridges in Cheshire
Grade I listed buildings in Cheshire
Bridges completed in 1824
Bridges across the River Dee, Wales
Cast-iron arch bridges in England